Haralapur is a village in Dharwad district of Karnataka, India.

Demographics 
As of the 2011 Census of India there were 667 households in Haralapur and a total population of 3,183 consisting of 1,599 males and 1,584 females. There were 373 children ages 0-6.

References

Villages in Dharwad district